Nanjilnad (pronounced Nanjil Nadu) is a historical region in India corresponding to present-day Thovalai and Agastheeshwaram of Kanyakumari district. The name is derived from nanj, meaning "plough", and nad, meaning "land". It was (and still is) an important centre of paddy (rice) cultivation. It is one of the five division of Venad (historical_region), which was divided for administrative purpose. 

Five Thirupappur families ruled the five lands of Venad. The Nanjilnad was ruled from a palace in Panavilai in the south uphill of the Kottaaru harbour. Parts of Nanjil nadu were intermittently ruled by Pandiyaas, and those lands were purchased by Venad before the declaration of Thivithaamcore Kingdom.

Tax revenue in Nanjil Nadu
The Kavalkinaru was the only gateway for the entire trade between Paandiya kingdom and Chaera Kingdom, and Kavalkinaru toll brought the kingdom a good revenue. The last chieftain of Kavalkinaru toll was Maathavadiyaan Thirupappur, whose family was staying in Vethakarakudieruppu.

The Vattakkottai was the storeyard of pearls and the fort was often taken over by Pandiyas and even europeans. With all that insurgence, vattakkottai was managed by Venad and it was another important source of tax revenue to Government.

Neeless to say the both taluks forms Nanjilnadu are fertile lands with paddyfields, coconut farms and of fishing hamlets, which too were formed a good part of Venad revenue.

The ships entering from the Arabian Sea to Kottaru harbour through the Palayaaru had to pay taxes based on the trade commodities. there were a minimum of 200 bullock carts came from Pandiya Elasa Naadu to Kottaru harbour to cross to the Kottaru market and to Vaniga Vizhai yard. At kottar St.Xaviers Church campus had a choultry belonging to Elasa Naadu which accommodated morethan 200 traders. 

Vaniga Vizhai yard had the mass storage of timber, coconut and paddy besides other trade items. 

The Nanjil Nadu tax revenue were stored in Kalasamirakki Kudieruppu east of Panavizhai Palace of Thirupappur Royals. Maaraveera Pandiyan Thirupappur followed by Ezha Marthandan Thirupappur(Swamiyadiyaar Thirupappur) and his tribes were managing the total tax revenue of Nanjil Nadu.

Safety of traders
In the southern uphill of Kottaru harbour was stationed an army, and the place was called as Pattaazha Vizhai. The army was supported by 12 Aasaans who managed the Panchavankaattu Chaalai(The University of 64 Arts). The army in Pattazha Vizhai was providing security to the Vaniga Vizhai Yard, Kalasamirakki Kudieruppu treasury, the Kottaru Harbour & Market, the Kavalkinaru Toll and the Vattakkottai pearl storage.

From Vaniga Vizhai, there always had bullock cart industry which had 7 units each was specialising in making different parts of the cart. Later some of the units were shifted near Chettikkulam and in the eastern gate of the harbour.

References

Historical Indian regions
Kanyakumari district